{{safesubst:#invoke:RfD||2=Apocrypha (fiction)|month = February
|day = 12
|year = 2023
|time = 07:52
|timestamp = 20230212075254

|content=
REDIRECT Canon (fiction)

}}